The Death of the Earth (French: La Mort de la Terre) is a 1910 Belgian novel by J.-H. Rosny aîné.

Plot summary
In the far future the Earth has become an immense, dry desert. Small communities of future humans, partially adapted to the harsher climate, survive united by the "Great Planetary" communications web. The means for human survival are rapidly diminishing beyond repair, the remaining supplies of water failing or becoming increasingly hard to find. Alongside of which a barely comprehensible form of life – "ferromagnetals" ("les ferromagnétaux") – have begun to develop and spread within and throughout the Earth itself.
 
The narrative focuses mainly on group of humans led by Targ, who at the beginning of the story is the "watchman" ("veilleur") of the Great Planetary.

See also 
 1910 in science fiction

External links
 

1910 novels
1910 science fiction novels
Belgian speculative fiction novels
French-language novels
Post-apocalyptic novels